The citizens of Donetsk are commonly called Donechyani. The following is a list of famous people that were born or brought up in the city:

Academics
 Alexander Anoprienko (b. 1957), Professor of Computer Engineering
 Volodymyr Biletskyy (b. 1950), Ukrainian scientist.
 Anatoly Timofeevich Fomenko (b. 1945), Russian Mathematician and lecturer at the Moscow University. Promoter of New Chronology.
 Valeriy Konovalyuk (b. 1966), an economist and businessman.
 Alexander Kuzemsky (b. 1944) - Soviet and Russian theoretical physicist.
 Kirill Borisovich Tolpygo (1916-1994), Soviet physicist and a Corresponding Member of the National Academy of Sciences of Ukraine.

Artists
 Viktor Burduk (b. 1957), an artist, a blacksmith.
 Pavlo Vigderhaus (1925-2013), Soviet architect, Monument to a Miner creator.

Athletes
 Polina Astakhova (1936-2005), Ukrainian gymnast.
 Serhiy Bubka (b. 1963), Ukrainian pole vault athlete; Olympic Games champion: 1988; World Champion: 1983, 1987, 1991, 1995, European Champion: 1986; Champion of the USSR: 1984, 1985.
 Yuriy Dehteryov (b. 1948), Soviet goalkeeper.
 Yuriy Gavrilov (b. 1967), Volleyball player, Olympic gold medallist.
 Julia Glushko (born 1990), Ukrainian-born Israeli tennis player
 Aleksandr Lebziak (b. 1969), Russian boxer.
 Natalya Mammadova (b. 1984), Azeri volleyball player.
 Ilya Mate (b. 1956), Olympic champion in 1980.
 Oleksiy Pecherov (b. 1985), a Ukrainian basketball player.
 Lilia Podkopayeva (b. 1978), a Ukrainian gymnast, and the 1996 Olympic All Around Champion
 Serhii Rebrov (b. 1974), footballer.
 Viktor Smyrnov (b. 1986), Paralympic swimmer.
 Viktor Sidyak (b. 1943), fencing, first Soviet individual sabre Olympic gold medal in Munich 1972, multiple times winner of World Championships and Olympic medalist (1968, 1972, 1976 and 1980).
 Nadiya Tkachenko (b. 1948), Olympic-gold winning pentathlete.
 Oleg Tverdovsky (b. 1976), Russian ice hockey player.
 Alexander Yagubkin (b. 1961), boxer.
 Oleg Vernyayev (b. 1993), Gymnast, Olympic gold medallist.
 Artem Yevlyanov (b. 1986), footballer

Business
 Rinat Akhmetov (b. 1966), Ukraine's wealthiest businessman, founder of System Capital Management, No. 47 in Forbes The World's Billionaires.
 Serhiy Arbuzov (b. 1976), head of Ukrainian Bank.
 Akhat Bragin (1953-1995), businessman and mobster.
 Valeriy Konovalyuk (b. 1966), an economist and businessman.
 Ihor Sorkin (b. 1967), head of the Ukrainian National Bank.

Entertainers
 Vera Filatova (b. 1982), actress.
 Yuri Kara, Russian film director and producer.
 Tatyana Kravchenko, Soviet and Russian actress.
 Make Me Famous - English language Metalcore band.
 Master SheFF, the leader of Bad Balance and creator of Russian hip hop.
 Siouzana Melikián, a Russian-Mexican actress.
 Vadim Pisarev, Ukrainian dancer and art Director of Donetsk State Academic Opera and Ballet Theatre named after Solovyanenko.
 Aleksandr Revva (b. 1974), comedian.
 Denis Shaforostov (b. 1992), Ukrainian musician, vocalist for Asking Alexandria
 Oleg Stefan (b. 1959), Russian actor.
 Anatoliy Solovyanenko (1932-1999), Soviet opera singer.
 Vladimir Grigoryevich Zakharov (1901-1956), Soviet composer.
 Tatiana Shmailyuk, Vocalist for Ukrainian metal band Jinjer. 
 Jinjer, Ukrainian heavy metal band.

Journalists
 Stanislav Aseyev, Ukrainian writer and journalist.
 Dmytro Gnap (b. 1977), journalist, investigating corruption.
 Oleksiy Matsuka (b. 1983), corruption investigator, Reporters Without Borders named Matsuka in its list of 100 Information Heroes.

Military
 Fyodor Berezin (b. 1960), Russian-language science fiction writer and Deputy Minister of Defence of the Donetsk People's Republic.
 Mikhail Krichevsky (1897-2008), the last surviving World War I veteran who fought for the Russian Empire.
 Aleksandr Zakharchenko (1976-2018), Prime Minister of the self-proclaimed Donetsk People's Republic.

Music
 Anna Korsun (born 1986), singer, pianist, composer
 Zhanulka (born 2004), singer, songwriter

Politicians
 Zalman Aran (Aharonovich) (1899-1970), Israeli social-democratic politician, minister of education (1955–1960) and (1963–1969).
 Mykola Azarov (b. 1947), former Prime Minister of Ukraine
 Nikita Khrushchev, General Secretary of the CPSU and Premier of the Soviet Union 1953–1964 (born in Kalinovka, Kursk Oblast, Russia but grew up in Yuzivka).
 Volodymyr Rybak, Mayor of Donetsk and Chairman of the Verkhovna Rada.
 Natan Sharansky, former Soviet dissident, anticommunist, Zionist, Israeli politician and writer.
 Petro Symonenko, head of the Communist Party of Ukraine.
 Viktor Yanukovych, deposed former president of Ukraine (due to Euromaidan Revolts of 2013–2014)
 Aleksandr Zakharchenko (1976-2018), Prime Minister of the self-proclaimed Donetsk People's Republic (deceased).

Writers
 Emma Andijewska, Ukrainian poet.
 Fyodor Berezin, Russian-language science fiction writer and Deputy Minister of Defence of the Donetsk People's Republic.
 Vladislav Adolfovitch Rusanov, Russian-language science fiction writer and chairman of the Donetsk People's Republic Writer's Union.
 Vasyl Stus, Ukrainian poet and publicist, one of the most active members of Ukrainian dissident movement.

Other
 Yevgeny Khaldei, Soviet photographer known for his photograph of a Soviet soldier raising a flag over the Reichstag.
 Dmytriy Leonidovich Cherniavskiy, senior manager and political adviser.
 Evgenij Miroshnichenko, Ukrainian chess player.
 Marina Tsvigun, religious sect leader, new age movement.

   Donetsk
Donetsk
Donetsk